The 1967 Memphis State Tigers football team represented Memphis State University (now known as the University of Memphis) as an independent during the 1967 NCAA University Division football season. In its tenth season under head coach Billy J. Murphy, the team compiled a 6–3 record and outscored opponents by a total of 206 to 150. The team played its home games at Memphis Memorial Stadium in Memphis, Tennessee. 

The team's statistical leaders included Terry Padgett with 436 passing yards, Rick Thurow with 394 rushing yards, Richard Coady with 260 receiving yards, and Nick Pappas and Russell Denof with 24 points scored each.

Schedule

References

Memphis State
Memphis Tigers football seasons
Memphis State Tigers football